Xylophanes alvarezsierrai is a moth of the family Sphingidae. It is from western Venezuela.

References

alvarezsierrai
Moths described in 2001
Endemic fauna of Venezuela
Moths of South America